Remove before flight is a safety warning often seen on removable aircraft and spacecraft components, typically in the form of a red ribbon, to indicate that a device, such as a protective cover or a pin to prevent the movement of mechanical parts, is only used when the aircraft is on the ground (parked or taxiing). On small general aviation aircraft, this may include a pitot tube cover or a control lock. The warning appears in English only. Other ribbons labelled "pull to arm" or similar are found on missiles and other weapon systems that are not mounted on aircraft. 

Remove-before-flight components are often referred to as "red tag items". Typically, the ground crew will have a checklist of remove-before-flight items. Some checklists will require the ribbon or tag to be attached to the checklist to verify it has been removed. Non-removal of a labelled part has caused airplane crashes, like that of Aeroperú Flight 603 and, in 1975, a Royal Nepal Airlines Pilatus PC-6 Porter carrying the wife and daughter of Sir Edmund Hillary.

It is common to see key rings, T-shirts, bag tags, belts and other such products with this ribbon, especially for people who work in aviation or are aviation enthusiasts.

A green tag is sometimes used to identify components that must be attached before flight in a similar way to remove before flight components.

Origin

During the countdown for Saturn I SA-5 on January 27, 1964, technicians discovered that a blind flange had not been removed from a liquid oxygen replenishing line for the first stage after an earlier pressurization test. The oversight prevented complete fueling and caused a two-day launch delay. To help prevent such mistakes, Andrew Pickett, chief of the Mechanical and Propulsion Systems Division at the Kennedy Space Center, implemented a new procedure at the direction of Hans Gruene, KSC assistant director for Launch Vehicle Operations.  Red flags would be attached to non-operational test equipment to alert pad personnel which items must be removed before a rocket flight.

References

See also

 Red tag
 Mind the gap

Aircraft ground handling
English phrases
Warning systems